Gisbert Wüstholz (born June 4, 1948 in Tuttlingen, Germany) is a German mathematician internationally known for his fundamental contributions to number theory (in the field of transcendental number theory, Diophantine approximation) and arithmetic geometry.

Education, Career and Research
Gisbert Wüstholz was born in 1948 in Tuttlingen (Baden-Württemberg) and studied from 1967 to 1973 at the University of Freiburg where he finished his PhD under the supervision of Theodor Schneider in 1978. On the invitation of Friedrich Hirzebruch he stayed for a year as a Postdoc at the University of Bonn and then he got a Postdoc position at the University of Wuppertal where he worked with Walter Borho from 1979 till 1984 and then moved to Bonn to become Associate Professor at the newly founded Max Planck Institute for Mathematics. From 1985 to 1987 he was full Professor for Mathematics at Wuppertal and in 1987 elected for a Chair in Mathematics at ETH Zurich. He founded the Zurich Graduate School in Mathematics in 2003 and served as the director since then until 2008. Since 2013 he is a professor emeritus at ETH Zurich.

He is Member of the German National Academy of Sciences Leopoldina (since 2000), of the Berlin-Brandenburg Academy of Sciences and Humanities (since 2003), of the Academia Europaea (since 2008) where he was chairman of the Mathematics Section from 2011-2013, and of the European Academy of Sciences and Arts (since 2016). From 1999 he was an Honorary Advisory Professor at the Tongji University, Shanghai. From 2011 he was Senator for Mathematics at the Leopoldina. He is an Honorary Professor at Graz University of Technology, Austria (since 2017).

Gisbert Wüstholz stayed for extended periods at a number of universities and research institutes such as the University of Michigan at Ann Arbor (1984,1988) and the Institut des Hautes Études Scientifiques in Bures-sur-Yvette (1987). He was member of the Institute for Advanced Study in Princeton (1986, 1990, 1994/95, 2011), in 1992 Visiting Fellow Commoner at Trinity College in Cambridge for research projects with Alan Baker and visited in the following year the Mathematical Sciences Research Institute in Berkeley (1993). He was frequently guest at the Max Planck Institute for Mathematics at Bonn and the Erwin Schrödinger International Institute for Mathematics and Physics (ESI) at Vienna. Since 2015 he is staying as a guest at the University of Zurich. In the academic year 2017/18 he was Senior Research Fellow at the Freiburg Institute for Advanced Studies (FRIAS).

Since 1980 Gisbert Wüstholz has close connections to a number of universities in Asia: he stayed for a couple of months each at Kyushu University at Fukuoka (1992), the Morningside Center of Mathematics of the Chinese Academy of Sciences at Beijing, at the Hong Kong University of Science and Technology (HKUST) (1996, 1997, 2006, 2010) and at the University of Hong Kong (HKU) (1999, 2011, 2012). Several visits took him to the Vietnam Institute for Advanced Study in Mathematics (VIASM) (2010, 2017), to the Korea Institute for Advanced Study (KIAS) and to the National Taiwan University at Taipei (2009, 2013, 2016).

In 1986 Gisbert Wüstholz delivered an invited address at the International Congress of Mathematicians (ICM) in Berkeley, in 1992 the Mordell Lecture in Cambridge, in 2001 the 13th Kuwait foundation lecture, an invited lecture at the Leonhard Euler Festival in St. Petersburg in 2007 on the occasion of the celebration of Leonhard Euler’s 300th birthday and the Academy Lecture at Berlin-Brandenburg Academy of Sciences and Humanities in 2008.

His research interests are Algebraic Geometry and Number Theory (in particular Diophantine Approximation and Transcendence Theory) and Hodge Theory (Periods). Highlights of his scientific work are his famous Analytic Subgroup Theorem (1989) which bases on the Multiplicity Estimates on Group Varieties which he published in 1989, his proof of the abelian analogue of the famous Lindemann’s theorem (wrongly called Lindermann-Weierstrass Theorem), the result which disproved the squaring of the circle, the joint work with Gerd Faltings on the Schmidt's Subspace Theorem, the Isogeny Estimates for Abelian varieties proved jointly with David Masser which furnishes an alternative approach to the Mordell conjecture and the joint work with Alan Baker on linear forms in logarithms. His Analytic Subgroup Theorem is now a central result in transcendence theory.

Selected publications

Books
Gerd Faltings, Gisbert Wüstholz et al.. Rational Points. Aspects of Mathematics, E6. Friedr. Vieweg & Sohn, Braunschweig (1st ed. 1984, 2nd ed. 1986), 3rd ed., 1992. Papers from the seminar held at the Max-Planck-Institut für Mathematick, Bonn/Wuppertal, 1983/1984, with an appendix by Wüstholz in 3rd ed.
Wüstholz, Gisbert (2002). A Panorama of Number Theory or the View from Baker's Garden (editor). Cambridge University Press, Cambridge. . .

Articles

Wüstholz, Gisbert (1987), "Algebraic Groups, Hodge Theory and Transcendence", Proceedings of the International Congress of Mathematicians, Vol. 1, 2 (Berkeley, Calif., 1986), 476-483. Amer. Math. Soc., Providence, RI. .

References

External links

Website of Prof. em. Dr. Gisbert Wüstholz, ETH
Prof. Dr. Gisbert Wüstholz, ETHZ-UZh-Sbg Arithmetic and Geometry Research Group  
Prof. Dr. Gisbert Wüstholz, Freiburg Institute for Advanced Studies (FRIAS)

1948 births
Living people
Institute for Advanced Study visiting scholars
20th-century German mathematicians
21st-century German mathematicians
Academic staff of ETH Zurich
University of Freiburg alumni
Arithmetic geometers